Helena Hillar Rosenqvist (born 1946) is a Swedish Green Party politician. She was a member of the Riksdag from 1998 until 2006. In the Riksdag, she was a member of the housing committee 1998–2006. She was also deputy in the justice committee, the culture committee, the social affairs committee and the traffic committee.

References

1946 births
21st-century Swedish women politicians
Living people
Members of the Riksdag 1998–2002
Members of the Riksdag 2002–2006
Members of the Riksdag from the Green Party
Women members of the Riksdag